Giuseppe "Pippo" Civati (born 4 August 1975) is an Italian politician and publisher, former leader of Possible and a member of the Chamber of Deputies from 2013 to 2018.

Biography

Comunal and Regional experiences 
Very close to Romano Prodi, Civati was elected to the City Council of Monza in 1997 and the following year he became city secretary of the Democrats of the Left. From 2002 to 2004 Civati has been a member of the provincial secretariat of the DS in Milan, while from 2005 to 2006 he has been a member of the regional secretariat of the party in Lombardy. On April 2005, Civati was elected in the Regional Council of Lombardy.

In the Democratic Party 
After Walter Veltroni's resignation, on the occasion of the 2009 Democratic Party primaries, Civati supported Ignazio Marino.

Together with Matteo Renzi, Civati started in 2010 the Leopolda convention, being a member of the current of Rottamatori (Scrappers). With the passing years, Civati became critical of Renzi's positions and the two split.

With the 2013 election, Civati is elected to the Chamber of Deputies and promoted a dialogue between his party and the Five Star Movement. Civati criticized the decision to form a government with The People of Freedom, so he didn't support the Letta Cabinet and later voted against the Renzi Cabinet.

Civati ran for the role of Secretary of the PD in occasion of the 2013 primaries, but was defeated by Matteo Renzi. When Renzi became Prime Minister, Civati began to clash with the leadership of the party, until he decided to leave the Democratic Party in May 2015 and founded a new centre-left party named Possible.

Free and Equal 
Possible was one of the founder parties of the left-wing Free and Equal coalition. Civati ran for the Chamber of Deputies in occasion of the 2018 election, but failed the election and later resigned from the office of Secretary of Possible.

2019 European Parliament election 
On the occasion of the 2019 European Parliament election Civati he was a candidate on the Green Europe list. After that an article by Il Foglio reported that two candidates on the list (Giuliana Farinaro and Elvira Maria Vernengo) had received support from the Green Front (led by Vincenzo Galizia, former leader of the youth section of the Tricolour Flame), Civati withdrew (informally) his candidacy and suspended his election campaign.

Civati was the most voted candidate on the list with 12,247 preferences, but he was not elected because EV got only 2.29% of the votes, below the 4% threshold established by the Italian electoral law.

References

External links 
Official blog
Files about his parliamentary activities (in Italian): XVII legislature.

1975 births
Living people
People from Monza
Democratic Party of the Left politicians
Democrats of the Left politicians
Democratic Party (Italy) politicians
Possible (Italy) politicians
Deputies of Legislature XVII of Italy
Members of the Regional Council of Lombardy
University of Milan alumni